The green-blooded skink (Prasinohaema virens), sometimes (ambiguously) known as "green tree skink", is a scincid lizard species native to New Guinea. The species is poorly studied and the species' risk of extinction has not been evaluated by the World Conservation Union, and does not appear in any CITES appendix.

The skink has developed setae on its toe pads (or digit pads) for climbing analogous to those of geckos and anoles, but the trait is believed to have evolved independently to these groups,  so is an example of convergent evolution. With regards to the trait, other species in the genus, P. flavipes and P. prehensicauda, have the primitive character, and lack the setae. Other skinks within the genus Lipinia have also evolved toe pad setae, and within the skink family, four morphologically distinct adhesive microstructures have evolved, possibly all with independent evolutionary origins. By contrast, anoles and geckos each use a single, common structure, although it appears to have evolved independently in the two groups.

As in other lizards of the genus Prasinohaema, the blood of  P. virens is green, rather than the usual red coloration of most vertebrates. The green blood pigmentation results in a strikingly bright lime-green coloration of muscles, bones, tongue, and mucosal tissue, and is the result of the accumulation of the bile pigment biliverdin in levels that would be toxic in all other vertebrates.  Biliverdin is formed from the breakdown of hemoglobin, and is normally converted to bilirubin.  However,  mutation in various genes regulating bilirubin formation is believed to lead to the formation and accumulation of high levels of biliverdin. It is speculated that the high biliverdin concentration protects against malaria.

Import to Australia 
In Australia, Importing this skink is prohibited under State and Territory legislation because the skink's risk as an invasive species has not yet been assessed. However, live specimens may be imported with a permit issued under the Environment Protection and Biodiversity Conservation Act 1999 for noncommercial purposes, such as research, but not as a household pet.

Geographic specifications 
This species of Prasinohaema is native to Papua New Guinea in southeast Asia. P. virens were named after their discovery in the late 19th century by the German zoologist Wilhelm Peters. The species resides across the New Guinean and Solomon Islands in altitudes ranging from sea level to 500m. P. virens inhabit lowland rainforest and plantations of different varieties. The high accumulation of biliverdin in this species blood makes it the only genus known to possess green blood in all of Asia. Due to the abundant rainforest and agrarianism, the species currently faces no clear threats to its habitat.

References

External links

http://www.biolib.cz/IMG/GAL/14560.jpg

Prasinohaema
Skinks of New Guinea
Reptiles described in 1881
Endemic fauna of New Guinea
Taxa named by Wilhelm Peters